Abies beshanzuensis (Baishanzu fir, Baishan fir) is a species of fir (genus Abies) in the family Pinaceae. It is endemic to Mt. Baishanzu in southern Zhejiang province in eastern China, where it grows at  altitude and is threatened by collection and climate change. The site is within the Fengyangshan – Baishanzu National Nature Reserve. Abies beshanzuensis is classified as critically endangered by the IUCN Red List.

It was discovered in 1963 on the summit of Baishanzu Shan (1,857 m), where only seven trees were found. Three of these were dug up and moved to Beijing Botanical Garden, where they died. By 1987, only three trees were left in the wild, making it the rarest conifer in the world. New planting of grafted plants on Baishanzu Shan and other nearby sites has shown some success, but the species remains critically endangered.

The shoots are stout, pale yellow-brown, hairless or slightly hairy.

It is closely related to Abies firma from southern Japan, placed with it as the only two members of Abies subsect. Firmae. The species Abies ziyuanensis is included in Abies beshanzuensis as a variety by some botanists, though others place this species in a different subsection of the genus, Abies subsect. Holophyllae.

References

beshanzuensis
Endemic flora of China
Flora of Zhejiang
Trees of China
Critically endangered flora of Asia
Taxonomy articles created by Polbot
Plants described in 1976